Vernon Patao (born February 13, 1970) is an American former weightlifter. He competed in the men's lightweight event at the 1992 Summer Olympics and the men's featherweight event at the 1996 Summer Olympics.

References

External links
 

1970 births
Living people
American male weightlifters
Olympic weightlifters of the United States
Weightlifters at the 1992 Summer Olympics
Weightlifters at the 1996 Summer Olympics
People from Wailuku, Hawaii
20th-century American people
21st-century American people